Madanpura is a village in the Mirzapur district of Uttar Pradesh, India.
It is situated around 20 km from the famous and ancient city of Varanasi.  It has good road links with Varanasi and Mirzapur.

References 

Villages in Mirzapur district